Edward James White (10 June 1869 – 22 April 1959) was an Australian politician.

He was born in Carapook to grazier Thomas George White and Margaret Ellen O'Brien. He had little formal education and was a rural itinerant worker, settling in Hamilton around 1895. He acquired land at Echuca and Cavendish in partnership with his brother, and on 25 April 1906 married Lily Crisp, with whom he had nine children. In 1907 he was elected to the Victorian Legislative Assembly as a non-Labor member for Western Province. He served as a Liberal, Nationalist and UAP member until his defeat in 1931. White retired to Melbourne in 1949 and died in Box Hill in 1959.

References

1869 births
1959 deaths
Nationalist Party of Australia members of the Parliament of Victoria
United Australia Party members of the Parliament of Victoria
Members of the Victorian Legislative Council